Wielopole is an administrative district within the city of Tarnobrzeg, Poland. It was formerly a village before it was annexed by the city in 1976.

Districts of Tarnobrzeg